Prostanthera verticillaris is a species of flowering plant in the family Lamiaceae and is endemic to a restricted area of Western Australia. It is a spreading shrub with whorled, egg-shaped to elliptic leaves and white to purplish-blue flowers.

Description
Flowering occurs from September to October.

Taxonomy
Prostanthera verticillaris was first formally described in 1988 by Barry Conn in the journal Nuytsia from specimens collected by Kenneth Newbey north-east of Albany in 1967.

Distribution and habitat
This mintbush grows on granite outcrops and is only known from the type location in the Esperance Plains biogeographic regions of Western Australia.

Conservation status
Prostanthera verticillaris is classified as "Priority One" by the Government of Western Australia Department of Parks and Wildlife, meaning that it is known from only one or a few locations which are potentially at risk.

References

verticillaris
Flora of Western Australia
Lamiales of Australia
Taxa named by Barry John Conn
Plants described in 1988